Ytterbium(III) oxide is the chemical compound with the formula Yb2O3. It is one of the more commonly encountered compounds of ytterbium. It has the "rare-earth C-type sesquioxide" structure which is related to the fluorite structure with one quarter of the anions removed, leading to ytterbium atoms in two different six coordinate (non-octahedral) environments.

Uses
 Colorant for glasses and enamels
 Dopant for garnet crystals in lasers
 Optical fibers

See also
 Active laser medium

References

External links
 Information at WebElements

Ytterbium compounds
Sesquioxides